Khalaj, also rendered as Kalach, in Iran may refer to:
 Khalaj, Ardabil
 Khalaj, East Azerbaijan
 Khalaj, Hamadan
 Khalaj, Isfahan
 Khalaj, Razavi Khorasan
 Khalaj-e Malmir, Markazi Province
 Khalaj-e Olya, Markazi Province
 Khalaj-e Sofla
 Khalaj, West Azerbaijan
 Khalaj, Urmia, West Azerbaijan Province
 Khalaj-e Ajam, West Azerbaijan Province
 Khalaj-e Kord, West Azerbaijan Province
 Khalaj, Khorramdarreh, Zanjan Province
 Khalaj, Mahneshan, Zanjan Province